Philip Saunders may refer to:

 Flip Saunders (1955–2015), American former basketball head coach
 Philip Saunders (cricketer) (born 1929), Australian-born cricketer
 Philip Saunders (philatelist), British banker and philatelist